Collins Tanor (born 4 January 1998 in Brong-Ahafo, Ghana) is a Ghanaian footballer who plays as a midfielder for American USL League Two side South Bend Lions.

Early career
Coming from Brong-Ahafo of Ghana, Tanor started out at the Right to Dream Academy since joining on a student-athlete scholarship at the age of 10. During his time at the academy, Collins captained the Ghana U17s – leading them to a four-nation tournament victory in 2014. He also guided the RtD Academy U18s to a second successive victory in the Gothia Cup in Sweden. In 2014, Tanor played in the Al Kass U17 International Cup in Qatar with Manchester City U17.

As a result, he would train and eventually sign with the club.

Club career

FC Nordsjælland (loan)
On 28 January 2016 it was confirmed, that Tanor had signed a season long loan deal with Danish Superliga-side FC Nordsjælland. He started the first five months at the club, playing for the reserve side.

Tanor got his FC Nordsjælland debut on 9 May 2016, where he played 45 minutes, before getting replaced by Godsway Donyoh in a 1–2 defeat against Brøndby IF in the Danish Superliga. He went on to make two appearances at the end of the 2015–16 season.

In the 2016–17 season, Tanor started the whole game, where the club beat AB Taarnby 4–1 in the second round of the Danish Cup. However, Tanor only played twomatches in the start of the 2016–17 season as a substitute, due to problems with his stomach. He was diagnosed with sport hernia in his stomach, and was out for six months following an operation. He made his rehabilitation in Manchester, before returning to Denmark. After he returned in April 2017, he began playing for the U19 squad. He was for example with the U19 squad in Düsseldorf, where they played a friendly tournament. It wasn't until 29 May 2017 when he made his return to the first team, coming on as a second-half substitute, in a 2–1 win over Brøndby IF in the last game of the league's Championship round.

In the 2017–18 season, Tanor started out playing in the reserve side for the most of the first half of the season and struggled to make a breakthrough in the first team. As a result, on 31 January 2018, FCN terminated the loan deal with midfielder.

KFCO Beerschot Wilrijk (loan)
After his two-years loan spell at FC Nordsjælland came to an end, Tanor left Manchester City when he joined KFCO Beerschot Wilrijk on a loan-contract until the end of this season, with an option for another year.

Tanor made his KFCO Beerschot Wilrijk debut, where he came on as a substitute later in the second-half, as they drew 1–1 against Oud-Heverlee Leuven on 16 February 2018.

Hobro IK (loan)
On 31 August 2018, Hobro IK announced, that they had signed Tanor on a loan-contract for the rest of the season.

Thisted FC (loan)
Tanor and Hobro interrupted the loan deal, and was loaned out to Thisted FC instead, for the rest of the season.

South Bend Lions
After a spell at Georgian club Shukura Kobuleti in 2021, Tanor was without club for almost a year, before joining American USL League Two side South Bend Lions in July 2022.

Playing style
Tanor's playing style is described as "a great talent who loves to control the game. He can either play as number 6 or 8 in the midfield. He is very energetic and thoughtful in his episodes."

References

External links
 
 

1998 births
Living people
Ghanaian footballers
Ghanaian expatriate footballers
Association football midfielders
People from Brong-Ahafo Region
Right to Dream Academy players
Manchester City F.C. players
FC Nordsjælland players
Hobro IK players
K Beerschot VA players
Thisted FC players
FC Shukura Kobuleti players
USL League Two players
Danish Superliga players
Danish 1st Division players
Ghanaian expatriate sportspeople in England
Ghanaian expatriate sportspeople in Denmark
Ghanaian expatriate sportspeople in Georgia (country)
Ghanaian expatriate sportspeople in the United States
Expatriate footballers in England
Expatriate men's footballers in Denmark
Expatriate footballers in Georgia (country)
Expatriate soccer players in the United States